Rodrigue Gabriel "Roddy" Beaubois (born 24 February 1988) is a French professional basketball player for Anadolu Efes of the Basketbol Süper Ligi (BSL) and the EuroLeague.

Early life 
Beaubois was discovered by NBA player Mickaël Piétrus at an open basketball camp in his native home island, Guadeloupe, located in the French West Indies. He made his professional debut in the 2006–07 season with Cholet Basket in the French Pro A League, where he was teammates with future Toronto Raptors guard Nando de Colo.

Professional career

Cholet Basket (2006–2009) 

In his first season with Cholet Basket, Beaubois played with the Cholet Espoirs, the junior team, where he averaged 10.8 points, 2.1 rebounds, 2.3 assists and 18.1 minutes per game. Beaubois spent the majority of the 2006–07 season with the Espoirs, averaging 13.2 points, 4.0 rebounds and 3.4 assists. He saw action in four French Pro A League games, in which he never scored. He also played 3 minutes in the 2007 Pro A playoffs, losing in the quarterfinals to Roanne.

Beaubois missed the first few weeks of the 2007–08 season due to a fractured bone in his left hand. He would play in the French Pro A League the whole season, averaging 5.5 points, 1.8 rebounds, and 1.4 assists in 15.1 minutes per game. He scored in double figures five times, recording a season high of 15 points against ASVEL Basket. Beaubois would lose in the quarterfinals again this time to Le Mans. Cholet Basket competed in the 2007–08 FIBA EuroChallenge. The EuroChallenge is the third tier in the European professional club basketball pyramid. Beaubois played in 3 games and averaged 4.7 points and 1 rebound and assists in 18.7 minutes. Cholet lost in the group stage of the competition going 2–4.

In his 29 games of the 2008–09 season, Beaubois averaged 10 points, 2.5 rebounds, 2.3 assists and 1.1 steals per game in 22.3 minutes. He improved as the season progressed. Notably, he recorded a career high 31 points, eight assists and five steals against Roanne. Cholet Basket did not qualify for the 2009 playoffs, but they participated in the second tier of the European professional club basketball pyramid. After losing to ASK Riga in the Eurocup preliminary rounds, Cholet competed again in the EuroChallenge. During the 2008–09 EuroChallenge, Beaubois nearly had a triple double, scoring 16 points, grabbing nine rebounds, and assisting eight times against Fribourg Olympic. Cholet would advance to the EuroChallenge Final Four, only to lose to Virtus Bologna.

Dallas Mavericks (2009–2013) 
Beaubois was an early entry candidate for the 2007 and 2008 NBA draft before withdrawing his name from consideration. Prior to the NBA draft, Beaubois caught the attention of scouts at the NBA Draft Combine with his measurements, boasting a 6' 9.75" wingspan (which is extraordinarily long, given his height) and 39" vertical leap. He was selected 25th overall in the 2009 NBA draft by the Oklahoma City Thunder, who traded him, along with a future 2nd round draft pick, to the Dallas Mavericks for Byron Mullens, the 24th overall pick in the 2009 NBA draft.

Playing only 3 minutes, Beaubois made his NBA debut against the Los Angeles Lakers. On 5 March 2010, Beaubois scored 22 points against the Sacramento Kings, becoming the first Maverick rookie to score 20 or more points since Maurice Ager in 2007. 22 days later, Beaubois scored a career-high 40 points and made a rookie record of 9 of 11 three-pointers against fellow rookie Steph Curry and the Golden State Warriors. Moreover, he became the first rookie in NBA history to shoot at least 50 percent from the floor, 40 percent from 3-point range, and 80 percent from the free throw line. He became the third Maverick rookie with 40 or more points in a game. The Mavericks finished the season with a 55–27 record, clinching the second seed in the Western Conference. In the first round of the 2010 NBA Playoffs, Dallas faced their rival the San Antonio Spurs. The Mavericks were down by 22 points in the first half of Game 6. Needing a spark to the offense, coach Rick Carlisle subbed Beaubois in and he led them back into the game scoring 16 points, however the Mavericks lost the game and series.

In early August 2010, Beaubois broke his foot while training with the French national basketball team. On 30 November 2010, Beaubois was assigned to the Texas Legends of the NBA D-League, but never played a single game with the team. In February 2011 he returned to practice with the Mavericks. After missing nearly 6 months due to a fractured foot, Beaubois made his season debut against the Sacramento Kings on 16 February 2011. In 21 minutes, he logged 13 points, 6 assists, 3 steals and 3 turnovers. The Mavericks went on to win the game 116–100. The following game against the Phoenix Suns Beaubois replaced DeShawn Stevenson in the starting lineup. Just before the start of the 2011 playoffs Beaubois sprained his left foot in a game against the Warriors. He was replaced in the starting line-up by Stevenson and did not return to action or see playing time during the two-month playoff run leading to the Mavericks' victories over the Blazers, Lakers, Thunder, and Heat en route to their first NBA Championship.

In late June 2011, Beaubois had foot surgery on his left foot for the second time. The Mavericks announced on 30 June 2011, that they exercised the contract option for Beaubois. In his first start of the 2011–12 season, Beaubois scored 22 points and grabbed 6 rebounds, adding career highs in assists with 7 and blocks with 4, in a win over the Utah Jazz. Dallas was swept in first round of the 2012 playoffs by Oklahoma City.

Beaubois scored a team high (and personal season high) of 19 points in 16 minutes against the Spurs on 25 January 2013. He underwent surgery to repair a fractured second metacarpal in his left hand near the end of the 2012–13 season. "I feel bad for the kid," Dirk Nowitzki said after Beaubois broke his hand against the Thunder on 17 March. "It's just sad. Just so many injuries. He's been here for four years and has missed a lot of action. It's tough. We feel bad for him. But he's a good kid." The Mavericks missed the playoffs for the first time since the 1999–00 season.

Spirou Charleroi (2014) 

On 26 March 2014, he signed with Spirou Charleroi of the Belgian League for the rest of the 2013–14 season. Beaubois averaged 9.4 points, 3.8 rebounds and 2.4 assists in 25.4 minutes per game for Spirou. Charleroi was defeated in the Playoff Quarterfinals by Port of Antwerp Giants.

France (2014–2016) 
On 19 June 2014, Beaubois signed with Le Mans Sarthe Basket for the rest of the 2014–15 LNB Pro A season.

On 7 July 2015, he signed a one-year contract with SIG Strasbourg.

Baskonia (2016–2018) 

On 22 July 2016, he signed a two-year deal with Baskonia of the Spanish Liga ACB and the EuroLeague. In his second season, he was the second-leading scorer of Baskonia in the EuroLeague, with 12.4 points per game.

Anadolu Efes (2018–present) 
On 21 June 2018, Beaubois signed with Anadolu Efes of the Turkish Basketbol Süper Ligi and EuroLeague. Over 35 games in 2018–19 EuroLeague season, he averaged 9.5 points and 2.3 assists per game.

Career statistics

NBA

Regular season

|-
| align="left" | 
| align="left" | Dallas
| 56 || 16 || 12.5 || .518 || .409 || .808 || 1.4 || 1.3 || .5 || .2 || 7.1
|-
| style="text-align:left;background:#afe6ba;"|†
| align="left" | Dallas
| 28 || 26 || 17.7 || .422 || .301 || .767 || 1.9 || 2.3 || .7 || .3 || 8.4
|-
| align="left" | 
| align="left" | Dallas
| 53 || 12 || 21.7 || .422 || .288 || .841 || 2.8 || 2.9 || 1.1 || .5 || 8.9
|-
| align="left" | 
| align="left" | Dallas
| 45 || 0 || 12.2 || .369 || .292 || .789 || 1.3 || 1.9 || .4 || .1 || 4.0
|- class="sortbottom"
| align="center" colspan="2" | Career
| 182 || 54 || 15.9 || .439 || .325 || .810 || 1.9 || 2.1 || .7 || .3 || 7.1

Playoffs

|-
| align="left" | 2010
| align="left" | Dallas
| 4 || 0 || 7.8 || .474 || .333 || .333 || 1.5 || 1.0 || .0 || .0 || 5.3
|-
| align="left" | 2012
| align="left" | Dallas
| 2 || 0 || 6.0 || .000 || .000 || .000 || .5 || 1.0 || .0 || .0 || .0
|- class="sortbottom"
| align="center" colspan="2" | Career
| 6 || 0 || 7.0 || .429 || .286 || .333 || 1.2 || 1.0 || .0 || .0 || 3.5

EuroLeague

|-
| style="text-align:left;"|2015–16
| style="text-align:left;"|Strasbourg
| 10 || 10 || 23.7 || .409 || .370 || 1.000 || 1.7 || 2.3 || 1.1 || .4 || 11.8 || 7.8
|-
| style="text-align:left;"|2016–17
| style="text-align:left;" rowspan="2"|Baskonia
| 30 || 12 || 20.3 || .457 || .380 || .870 || 1.4 || 1.7 || .4 || .5 || 11.7 || 8.4
|-
| style="text-align:left;"|2017–18
| 33 || 17 || 21.3 || .498 || .400 || .894 || 2.4 || 1.8 || .7 || .4 || 12.4 || 10.6
|-
| style="text-align:left;"|2018–19
| style="text-align:left;"|Anadolu Efes
| 35 || 19 || 21.3 || .442 || .400 || .912 || 1.3 || 2.3 || .3 || .3 || 9.5 || 7.8
|- class="sortbottom"
| align="center" colspan="2" | Career
| 108 || 58 || 21.0 || .461 || .391 || .899 || 1.7 || 2.0 || .5 || .4 || 11.2 || 8.8

National team career 
Beaubois was a member of the French junior national teams. He later joined the French senior team. He did not participate in the 2012 Summer Olympics, due to his 2010 injury, nor did he contend in EuroBasket 2013.

See also 
 List of European basketball players in the United States

References

External links 

 Rodrigue Beaubois  at acb.com 
 Rodrigue Beaubois at draftexpress.com
 
 Rodrigue Beaubois at euroleague.net
 Rodrigue Beaubois at lnb.fr 

1988 births
Living people
Anadolu Efes S.K. players
Black French sportspeople
Cholet Basket players
Dallas Mavericks players
French expatriate basketball people in Belgium
French expatriate basketball people in Turkey
French expatriate basketball people in the United States
French men's basketball players
French people of Guadeloupean descent
Guadeloupean men's basketball players
Le Mans Sarthe Basket players
Liga ACB players
National Basketball Association players from France
Oklahoma City Thunder draft picks
Point guards
Shooting guards
SIG Basket players
Spirou Charleroi players
French expatriate basketball people in Spain
Saski Baskonia players